Actia pokharana is a species of tachinid flies in the genus Actia of the family Tachinidae.

References

pokharana
Diptera of Asia
Insects described in 1970